The 1991–92 Old Dominion Monarchs men's basketball team represented Old Dominion University in the 1991–92 college basketball season. This was head coach Oliver Purnell's first of three seasons at Old Dominion. The Monarchs compete in the Colonial Athletic Association and played their home games at the ODU Fieldhouse. They finished the season 15–15, 8–6 in CAA play to finish in fourth place during the regular season. They went on to win the 1992 CAA men's basketball tournament to earn the CAA's automatic bid to the NCAA tournament. They earned a 15 seed in the East Region where they were beaten by 2 seed Kentucky in the opening round.

Roster

Schedule and results

|-
!colspan=9 style=| Regular season

|-
!colspan=10 style=| CAA tournament

|-
!colspan=10 style=| NCAA tournament

References

Old Dominion
Old Dominion Monarchs men's basketball seasons
Old Dominion
Old Dominion
Old Dominion